Ken Stonestreet nicknamed "Nebo" was an Australian professional rugby league footballer who played in the 1960s and 1970s. He played for Western Suburbs and Eastern Suburbs in the New South Wales Rugby League (NSWRL) competition.

Playing career
Stonestreet made his first grade debut for Eastern Suburbs against Newtown in 1963 at Henson Park which ended in a 19-0 loss. Stonestreet played with Easts between 1963 and 1966 but his time at the club was not successful as they finished last in 1963, 1965 and 1966. In his final year at Easts, the club went the whole season without winning a single game. As of 2019, Eastern Suburbs are the last team to have gone the whole year without winning a match.

Stonestreet joined Western Suburbs in 1967. In 1969, Stonestreet was selected to play for New South Wales and featured in one game against Queensland. Stonestreet's time at Western Suburbs was mixed with the club missing the finals each year and finished last in 1971. Stonestreet retired as a player at the end of 1972 and then went on to coach the Western Suburbs Under 23 team for 2 seasons.

References

1942 births
2015 deaths
Australian rugby league players
Western Suburbs Magpies players
Sydney Roosters players
New South Wales rugby league team players
Rugby league hookers
Rugby league players from Sydney